Ryan Heath Rorie (August 28, 1976 – September 5, 2014) known professionally as Killer was an American drag performer known for her old Hollywood glamour, clever concepts, and razor-sharp lip syncs with Lypsinka-inspired swagger.

Career
Killer was a regular performer at: Trannyshack, Bears in Space, and Dragula (where he won the Miss Dragula contest in July 2014). Queerty interviewed several drag performers who knew Killer and praised him for his unique performance which "did not conform" to expectations, yet remained "classy," according to Cupcake Canne.

References

External links

 
 

2014 deaths
1976 births
American drag queens